Take Over the Moon is the second extended play by the Chinese boy band WayV. It was released on October 29, 2019, by Label V and SM Entertainment, with Dreamus as the South Korean distributor and Owhat as the distributor for China. Consisting of six songs that fall mostly on R&B and hip-hop genres with influence from trap and electropop, the album features participation from songwriters and production teams, such as Moonshine, Adrian Mckinnon, Yoo Young-jin, LDN Noise, and others. Members Hendery and Yangyang also participated in writing lyrics for the first time. Upon its release, the album marked the group's debut on Billboard Heatseekers Albums and Gaon Album Chart.

To promote the album, the group released a digital single of an English version of "Love Talk" on November 5, 2019, which immediately earned number three position on Billboard Digital Song Sales. They also did their first performance in South Korea by performing the lead single "Moonwalk" on several television music programs and went on a promotional tour to three countries in Asia.

The special version of the album titled Take Over the Moon - Sequel was released physically on March 13, 2020, by SM and Dreamus. It features two additional tracks, the English version of "Love Talk" and a monologue track. The album earned the top three position on Gaon Album Chart.

Background and release

Take Over The Moon
After releasing their first extended play Take Off, WayV released a symbol image and a schedule for their second album Take Over the Moon on October 22, 2019. Mysterious and dream-like teaser photos of each member were released each day throughout their social media accounts leading up to the release of the album and its lead single "Moonwalk". The album was released digitally and physically on October 29 by Label V and SM Entertainment with Owhat as the distributor for China and Dreamus for South Korea.

An English version of the track "Love Talk" and its music video were released as a digital single a week later on November 5.

Take Over The Moon - Sequel
On March 20, WayV released a video teaser for the special version of the album titled Take Over the Moon - Sequel. Composed of six songs from the original tracklist, the album also contains two additional tracks, the English version of "Love Talk" and a narration track "WayV.oice #1". The album is only available in physical form and was released by SM Entertainment and Dreamus on March 30, 2020.

Composition

Take Over The Moon
Take Over the Moon is opened by the lead single “Moonwalk” which is stylistically a sonic adventure soundtrack for the accompanying music video, beginning with a soft melody, then turning into a propulsive electropop song that layers harmonizing ad-libs beneath impactful raps. Brassy horns, atmospheric synths, and trap beats drive much of the tune, but a hard-rock-infused instrumental bridge arrives before the sweeping finale. The second song “Yeah Yeah Yeah” is an energetic song that harmonizes the trap source with R&B code, and the bass distortion creates grandeur, expressing WayV’s passion for a stage. The song is followed by “Love Talk” that features the group singing and rapping seductively over a melody with old-school R&B vibes as it flits over sleek, tinny percussion, which evokes trap and Latin pop elements. The fourth track “King of Hearts” saw first participation in lyrical writing by members Hendery and Yangyang in the group's discography. It is a mid-tempo song based on R&B hip-hop that has a soft yet sorrowful mood, performed by members Winwin, Lucas, Hendery, and Yangyang. The song is followed by “Face to Face”, an outstanding ballad song performed by members Kun, Ten, and Xiaojun, led by a piano melody. The album is then closed by “We go nanana", a funky and cheerful teen pop song that also features lyrics by Hendery and Yangyang.

Take Over The Moon - Sequel
Following the release of the special version of the album on March 30, 2020, two tracks were added to the original 6-track release. The first track is an English version of "Love Talk" with lyrics written by Adrian Mckinnon and Ebenezer Fabiyi. The second track is "WayV.oice #1", a narration track of the members reading their gratitude message for fans accompanied by music by minGtion.

Singles and promotion

Singles
Released on October 29, 2019, the music video of the lead single “Moonwalk” takes WayV on an interstellar journey. The group’s performance lives up to the song’s title, and the music video sees WayV’s members moonwalking their way through high-intensity choreography as they travel to their final destination. The song debuted and peaked at number twenty-three on Billboard World Digital Song Sales.

An English version of “Love Talk” was released digitally on November 5. The song is the group’s first English single, meant to show the love from WayV towards their international fans. The single was released alongside a music video that has the seven members of WayV charismatically staring down the camera as they perform the smooth tune. It debuted at number three on Billboard World Digital Song Sales, while it earned number two on QQ Music Weekly Digital Sales and certified with a Double Gold for surpassing sales of 500,000 yuan.

Live performances
WayV had their first comeback stage for the album Take Over the Moon during MBC Music's Show Champion on October 30 where they performed “Moonwalk”, marking their first performance in Korea. It was followed by a performance on SBS MTV's The Show on November 5.

The group then went on a promotional tour titled Section#1_We Are Your Vision to five cities in three countries, Wuhan, Shenzhen, China, Seoul, and Bangkok, spanning over five days between November 23 to December 28, 2019. They performed “Moonwalk”, “Love Talk”, “Face to Face”, and “King of Hearts” from Take Over the Moon, and also songs from their first EP Take Off.

Commercial performance
Upon its release, Take Over the Moon claimed its number one iTunes position in 16 regions. The album also became WayV’s debut on Billboard Heatseekers Albums and Gaon Album Chart by ranking at number twenty-four and five, respectively. It eventually ranked at number twelve on Gaon Monthly Album Chart with sales over 31,000 copies.

Only released physically in March 2020, the special version of the album Take Over the Moon – Sequel ranked at number three on Gaon Album Chart and sold more than 24,000 copies in its first month.

Track listing

Charts

Release history

References

2019 EPs
Mandarin-language albums
SM Entertainment EPs
WayV albums
IRiver EPs